Gornja Jelenska is a village in the municipality Popovača, Sisak-Moslavina County in Croatia. According to the 2001 census, there are 887 inhabitants, in 279 of family households.

Gornja Jelenska is located on the south slopes of Moslavačka gora.

On 1 October 2020, the village became a new hotspot of the COVID-19 pandemic after a book promotion during which nobody was wearing face masks. 149 people from Gornja Jelenska and Popovača have tested positive for COVID-19, comprising about a quarter of new cases in the whole country that day.

References 

Populated places in Sisak-Moslavina County
COVID-19 pandemic in Croatia